Central Banda is a dialect continuum of the Banda languages spoken by around one million people, primarily in the Central African Republic. The varieties may be mutually intelligible, especially the Mid-Southern–Gobu–Kpagua–Mono–Ngundu cluster. The other varieties are Bambari, Banda-Banda, Mbrès, Ndélé, and Togbo-Vara Banda.

Phonology

Consonants

Vowels

Tone 
Vowel tones are: rising /ǎ/, falling /â/, mid /ā/, low /à/, and high /á/.

Varieties
Central Banda language varieties listed by Moñino (1988):
Yakpà (also in DR Congo); Gubú (also in DR Congo); Kpágùà (also in DR Congo); Ngùndù, Bòngò, Wasá (also in South Sudan); Dùkpù (also in South Sudan) Further information:Dukpu people
Lìndá, Jòtò, Ndòkpà, Ngápó
Southern Gbàgà, Nbìyì, Bèrèyà, Ngòlà, Ndi, Kâ, Gbambiya, Hàì, Galabò, Vídìrì (Mvédèrè) (also in South Sudan), Bàndà-Bàndà, Burú (only in South Sudan), Wùndù (only in South Sudan), Gòv̂òrò (only in South Sudan)
Bàndà-Ndele (Govo, Ngàjà, Gbòngó, Mbàtá, Gbàyà, Tulu, and Dabùrù groups), Bàndà-Kpaya (only in South Sudan), Ngàò, Ngbalá, Tàngbàgò (also in South Sudan), Júnguru (also in South Sudan)
Mbere, Búkà, Mòrùbà, Sàbángà, Wádà (also in South Sudan)
Vàrà (also in South Sudan), Tògbò (also in South Sudan)
Yàngere

Nougayrol (1989) also lists Kɔ̀nɔ́, Manja, Ndòkà, Njùlúgù, and Sàra Dìnjo.

Demographics
Demographics of Central Banda language varieties as synthesized from Moñino (1988) and Nougayrol (1989):

See also
Mono language

References

Languages of the Central African Republic
Languages of the Democratic Republic of the Congo
Languages of South Sudan
Banda languages